Thomas Ballenger may refer to:

 Thomas Cass Ballenger (1926–2015), American politician
 Thomas Lee Ballenger (1882–1987), American historian, author and teacher